Kings Langley is a village, former manor and civil parish in Hertfordshire, England,  north-west of Westminster in the historic centre of London and to the south of the Chiltern Hills. It now forms part of the London commuter belt. The village is divided between two local government districts by the River Gade with the larger western portion in the Borough of Dacorum and smaller part, to the east of the river, in Three Rivers District. It was the location of Kings Langley Palace and the associated King's Langley Priory, of which few traces survive.

The earliest mention in surviving documents of the manor of Langalega is in a Saxon charter dated circa 1050. It appears as Langelai in the Domesday Book of 1086, and is recorded as Langel' Regis ("Langley of the King") in 1254. The name means "long wood or clearing".

History 
A Roman villa has been excavated just south of the village.

The manor was probably a possession of the Abbey of St. Albans, the records of which have been lost. Following the Norman Conquest of 1066 the manor was one of hundreds given to Robert, Count of Mortain, uterine half-brother of King William the Conqueror. His tenant was a certain Ralf. The present village developed as a linear village along the old road from London to Berkhamsted and beyond to the Midlands. In the Domesday Book of 1086, Langley was in the hundred of Danish. By 1346 the place was known as Kyngeslangley and by 1428 as Lengele Regis.

In about 1276 the manor was purchased by Queen Eleanor of Castile (1241–1290), wife of King Edward I, and Kings Langley Palace was built on the hill to the west of the village with a deer park extending to the south. King's Langley Priory, of the Dominican Order, of which remains survive,  was founded next to the palace. The palace and the grand priory church fell into disrepair at the Dissolution of the Monasteries and little remains above ground level.

The Church of All Saints was built during the 14th century on the site of an earlier church.

It was the birth-place of Edmund of Langley, 1st Duke of York (1341–1402), 4th surviving son of King Edward III (grandson of Edward I), whose tomb survives in All Saints Church. The body of King Richard II, eldest grandson and successor of King Edward III, was buried here after his probable murder at Pontefract Castle in 1400. It was later removed to Westminster Abbey, next to the Palace of Westminster.

The 18th century Sparrows Herne turnpike road (later the A41 trunk road) traversed the Chilterns via the valley of the River Gade and ran down the village high street. The 16th century Saracen's Head public house is a coaching inn which flourished in this period.

The Grand Union Canal dating from 1797, and the 1838, London and Birmingham Railway which later became the West Coast Main Line, (the main railway line from London to the north west) pass just east of the village at Kings Langley railway station. There are many businesses located near the station in Home Park Industrial Estate which is also the site of the Construction and Engineering Centre of West Herts College.

20th century housing developments have led to the village spreading out on either side of the main road. The A41 has now been diverted west of the village leaving the high street to local traffic for the first time in centuries.

During the Second World War, the village was home to the secret headquarters in Britain of the Polish Underground army based at Barnes Lodge just off the Hempstead Road near Rucklers Lane.

Kings Langley was the site of the factory making Ovaltine chocolate drink; the listed factory facade, designed c.1923 by James Albert Bowden is now all that is left and still stands alongside the railway line among a new housing development. The Ovaltine factory itself has been converted into a series of flats and duplexes.

The former Ovaltine Egg Farm was converted into energy-efficient offices which house Renewable Energy Systems. The complex incorporates a highly visible 225 kW Vestas V29 wind turbine alongside the M25.

Kings Langley School is the local comprehensive school, situated on Love Lane to the west of the village.

Kings Langley was also the site of a Waldorf School, the Rudolf Steiner School Kings Langley which closed in 2019. This was built on the grounds of the old palace, of which only a small basement part of a pillar remains to be seen. There was a small display cabinet of finds from the palace period in the school entrance foyer.

The village became twinned with Achiet-le-Grand in France in November 2009, in honour of Christopher Cox from the village who won a Victoria Cross in fighting near Achiet-le-Grand in the First World War.

Roads 

The M25, the London orbital motorway, passes just south of the village on an imposing viaduct across the River Gade valley. To the north of junction 20 with the A41, a dual-carriageway bypasses Kings Langley and continues to the south of Tring where it flows into the original motorway-standard by-pass. The old route through Kings Langley is now classified the A4251.

Rucklers Lane

Just to the north of Kings Langley is a small village called Rucklers Lane, named after the road it is built on. The origin of the settlement in the early 20th century was the construction of a number of mock tudor houses for the workers on the nearby Shendish Manor estate. A community hall was also built for the workers in 1909 as a memorial to Arthur Longman, the owner of the estate; it was originally intended as a chapel of ease to avoid the long walk to the parish church. Further west along the lane is Phasels Wood Scout Camp and Activity Centre which opened in 1937.

Mentions in literature

William Shakespeare's Richard II (1595), Act III, Scene IV, is set in the garden of the palace at Langley.
Emily Sarah Holt's novel The White Rose of Langley (1875) has many scenes in the palace. (Download available at Project Gutenberg)
 In the 2010 book  Beautiful Darkness the character Olivia Durand is from Kings Langley.
 Mentioned by housekeeper Mrs Swabb in the 1973 play  Habeas Corpus written by Alan Bennett

Sport

Football
Kings Langley FC, as of 2023, currently play in the Premier (Central) Division of the Southern Football League.

Cricket
Kings Langley CC currently play in Divisions 2B, 8B and 11E of the Saracens Hertfordshire Cricket League.

Bowls
Kings Langley Bowls Club is situated in Green Park at the end of the Nap car park. It is a popular lawn bowls club with club and district competitions for bowlers of all abilities. It includes a club house with licensed bar and good social programs.

Notable people

Ancestors of U.S. President Jimmy Carter with the Carter surname lived in village 1361–1588
Christopher Augustus Cox VC (1889–1959), soldier decorated for working as a stretcher bearer under heavy fire in France, 1917
Edmund of Langley, 1st Duke of York (1341–1402), the fourth surviving son of King Edward III of England and Philippa of Hainault and the founder of the House of York
Captain Alan Rice-Oxley DFC (1898–1961), RAF officer, First World War fighter ace
Griff (born 2001), singer and songwriter
Benny Green (1927–1998), saxophonist and radio personality
Bruce Grocott, Baron Grocott (b. 1940), former Labour MP for The Wrekin and Telford and current Chancellor of the University of Leicester
Graham Taylor OBE, (1944–2017), former England football manager and former manager and chairman of Watford F.C.
Luke Donald (b. 1977), professional golfer and former world no.1 lived in Kings Langley and attended the Rudolph Steiner School
Frank Toovey Lake, (1849–1868) a member of the mill-owning Toovey family and a Victorian sailor who died in Japan while a member of Richard Henry Brunton's lighthouse survey party
Steven Finn (b. 1989), former England cricket international
Anthony Joshua (b. 1989), former World Heavyweight Champion attended Kings Langley School
Stuart Slater (b. 1969), former West Ham United footballer
John Milbank (b. 1952), Anglican theologian
Ondine Achampong British artistic gymnast world, European commonwealth medalist

Notes
 See full reference details below.

References

Kings Langley, its history and local architecture Kings Langley Local History and Museum Society. Accessed January 2008
Kings langley Roman Villa at UK Archaeology Map. Accessed January 2008
Hertfordshire Federation of Women's Institutes; Ann Roxburgh (Forward) (1986). The Hertfordshire Village Book. Countryside Books. Section on Kings Langley. .

External links

 Kings Langley Secondary School
 Rudolf Steiner School Kings Langley
 Kings Langley (A Guide to Old Hertfordshire)
 Kings Langley Churches
 Kings Langley and Bakau (Gambia) Link

Villages in Hertfordshire
Dacorum
Civil parishes in Hertfordshire
Burial sites of the House of York
Burial sites of the House of Plantagenet
Burial sites of the Mortimer family